Darwin's leaf-eared mouse (Phyllotis darwini) is a species of rodent in the family Cricetidae.

It has terrestrial habits and is endemic to coastal central and northern Chile. It is also found in the Atacama Desert. Members of the species have been found in the Llanos de Challe national park of the Atacama Desert. As a nocturnal rodent, P. darwini utilize the varying degrees of moonlight to determine predation risk and will often alter foraging habits in favor of avoiding predators.

References

Phyllotis
Endemic fauna of Chile
Mammals of Chile
Atacama Desert
Mammals described in 1837
Taxonomy articles created by Polbot